Rostock, officially the University and Hanseatic City of Rostock is the largest city in the German federal state of Mecklenburg-Western Pomerania.

Rostock may also refer to:

Places
Rostock (district), a district in the north of Mecklenburg-Vorpommern, Germany
Rostock-Lichtenhagen, a borough of Rostock in the federal state Mecklenburg-Vorpommern, Germany.
Rostock Hauptbahnhof, also Rostock Central Station (from 1896 until the turn of the 20th century called Rostock Central-Bahnhof), the main railway station in the German city of Rostock.
Rostock–Laage Airport
Rostock Port
University of Rostock
Bezirk Rostock, a district (Bezirk) of East Germany
Dals Rostock, a locality situated in Mellerud Municipality, Västra Götaland County, Sweden
Rostock Switzerland, a terminal moraine landscape and part of the Kösterbeck Nature Reserve

People
Marlies Rostock (born 1960), East German cross-country skier
Paul Rostock (1892–1956), German official, surgeon, and university professor

Music
Jennifer Rostock, German rock band

Others
Lordship of Rostock or Principality of Rostock, was a state of the Holy Roman Empire in the 13th and early 14th centuries 
Rostock Peace Treaty, a treaty, or Landfriede, agreed on 13 June 1283 in Rostock to secure the peace on land and at sea, as well as the protection of taxes and other freedoms
SMS Rostock, a light cruiser of the Karlsruhe class built by the German Kaiserliche Marine (Imperial Navy)
Rostock, a faction in the Sky Crawlers book series

See also
 Rostov (disambiguation)